Tahiti Championship D2(), also known as Championnat de Tahiti 2eme division is the second tier of rugby union club competition division in Tahiti. It is operated by Fédération Polynésienne de Rugby-Tahiti (FPR)  which also runs the division directly above, the first division Tahiti Championship. It is Overseas France best supported second tier rugby union league.

References

Rugby union in Tahiti
Rugby union competitions in Oceania